Mayan-e Sofla (also Romanized as Māyān-e Soflá; also known as Ashaghi Mayan, Buyuk Mayān, Eshāgī Māyān, Maiané Sofla, Māyān, Māyān-e Pā’īn, and Māyān Pa‘īn) is a village in Aji Chay Rural District, in the Central District of Tabriz County, East Azerbaijan Province, Iran. At the 2016 census, its population was 6,596 in 1,965 families.

Related links 
 Mayan-e Sofla in the Persian Wikipedia
 Mayan-e Sofla on the Google Maps

References 

Populated places in Tabriz County